Agency for International Development v. Alliance for Open Society International may refer to either of two United States Supreme Court cases:

 USAID v. Alliance for Open Society (2013) (alternatively called Alliance for Open Society I), 570 U.S. 205 (2013), a case in which the Court ruled that conditions imposed on an organization receiving federal grants restricted the freedom of speech.
 USAID v. Alliance for Open Society (2020) (alternatively called Alliance for Open Society II), 591 U.S. ___ (2020), a case in which the Court upheld those same conditions on the organization's foreign affiliates.

See also 
 List of United States Supreme Court cases
 Lists of United States Supreme Court cases by volume